The 2019 Valencian regional election was held on Sunday, 28 April 2019, to elect the 10th Corts of the Valencian Community. All 99 seats in the Corts were up for election. The election was held simultaneously with the April 2019 Spanish general election. This was the first early regional election ever held in the Valencian Community, as well as the first Valencian election to not be held concurrently with other regional elections.

The Socialist Party of the Valencian Country (PSPV) and Coalició Compromís formed a minority coalition government in 2015, relying on confidence and supply support from Podemos, an arrangement which was dubbed the "Botànic Agreement" and forced the governing People's Party (PP) into opposition after dominating Valencian politics during the previous 20 years. The political landscape experienced some changes during the next four years, with the PP losing support to the emerging liberal Citizens (Cs) party and the right-wing populist Vox, while on the left, United Left of the Valencian Country (EUPV) formed an electoral alliance with Podemos called Unides Podem.

The election resulted in a reduced majority for the left-wing parties. The PSPV emerged as the largest party for the first time since 1991, whereas the PP suffered the worst result in its history. Cs and Vox benefited from the PP's losses, the latter entering the Corts for the first time. Compromís and Unides Podem had disappointing finishes, losing seats and ending up in fourth and sixth place, respectively. These results led to a continuation of the 2015 Botànic Agreement, though this time Podemos and EUPV joined the government as full coalition partners.

Overview

Electoral system
The Corts Valencianes were the devolved, unicameral legislature of the Valencian autonomous community, having legislative power in regional matters as defined by the Spanish Constitution and the Valencian Statute of Autonomy, as well as the ability to vote confidence in or withdraw it from a regional president.

Voting for the Corts was on the basis of universal suffrage, which comprised all nationals over 18 years of age, registered in the Valencian Community and in full enjoyment of their political rights. Additionally, Valencians abroad were required to apply for voting before being permitted to vote, a system known as "begged" or expat vote. The 99 members of the Corts Valencianes were elected using the D'Hondt method and a closed list proportional representation, with a threshold of five percent of valid votes—which included blank ballots—being applied regionally. Parties not reaching the threshold were not taken into consideration for seat distribution. Seats were allocated to constituencies, corresponding to the provinces of Alicante, Castellón and Valencia, with each being allocated an initial minimum of 20 seats and the remaining 39 being distributed in proportion to their populations (provided that the seat-to-population ratio in any given province did not exceed three times that of any other).

As a result of the aforementioned allocation, each constituency was entitled the following seats for the 2019 regional election:

Election date
The term of the Corts Valencianes expired four years after the date of their previous election, unless they were dissolved earlier. The election decree was required to be issued no later than the twenty-fifth day prior to the date of expiry of parliament and published on the following day in the Official Journal of the Valencian Government (DOGV), with election day taking place on the fifty-fourth day from publication. The previous election was held on 24 May 2015, which meant that the legislature's term would have expired on 24 May 2019. The election decree was required to be published in the DOGV no later than 30 April 2019, with the election taking place on the fifty-fourth day from publication, setting the latest possible election date for the Corts on Sunday, 23 June 2019.

The president had the prerogative to dissolve the Corts Valencianes and call a snap election, provided that no motion of no confidence was in process. In the event of an investiture process failing to elect a regional president within a two-month period from the first ballot, the Corts were to be automatically dissolved and a fresh election called.

Background
The 2015 regional election had resulted in the People's Party's (PP) expulsion from the regional government after a 20-year uninterrupted rule. Amid a string of corruption scandals that kept shocking the party and brought down many of its historical figureheads apparently involved in the scandals, the regional PP found itself leaderless and in a precarious situation.

'Operation Taula', a major police operation in Valencia that took place on 26 January 2016, resulted in the arrest of several former and current high-ranking members from the regional PP branch, as a consequence of the ongoing investigation on the PP's corruption in the region during its time in government. Judicial investigation also pointed to former long-time Mayor of Valencia Rita Barberá as a participant in the scandal; her arrest or imputation only being prevented by the fact she had legal protection as an incumbent senator. A few days later, on 1 February, all PP city councillors in the city of Valencia were charged for a possible money laundering offense, including new local party leader Alfonso Novo, as well as most members of Barberá's late government.

Parliamentary composition
The Corts Valencianes were officially dissolved on 5 March 2019, after the publication of the dissolution decree in the Official Journal of the Valencian Community. The table below shows the composition of the parliamentary groups in the Corts at the time of dissolution.

Parties and candidates
The electoral law allowed for parties and federations registered in the interior ministry, coalitions and groupings of electors to present lists of candidates. Parties and federations intending to form a coalition ahead of an election were required to inform the relevant Electoral Commission within ten days of the election call, whereas groupings of electors needed to secure the signature of at least one percent of the electorate in the constituencies for which they sought election, disallowing electors from signing for more than one list of candidates.

Below is a list of the main parties and electoral alliances which contested the election:

Campaign

Party slogans

Election debates

Opinion polls
The tables below list opinion polling results in reverse chronological order, showing the most recent first and using the dates when the survey fieldwork was done, as opposed to the date of publication. Where the fieldwork dates are unknown, the date of publication is given instead. The highest percentage figure in each polling survey is displayed with its background shaded in the leading party's colour. If a tie ensues, this is applied to the figures with the highest percentages. The "Lead" column on the right shows the percentage-point difference between the parties with the highest percentages in a poll.

Voting intention estimates
The table below lists weighted voting intention estimates. Refusals are generally excluded from the party vote percentages, while question wording and the treatment of "don't know" responses and those not intending to vote may vary between polling organisations. When available, seat projections determined by the polling organisations are displayed below (or in place of) the percentages in a smaller font; 50 seats were required for an absolute majority in the Corts Valencianes.

Voting preferences
The table below lists raw, unweighted voting preferences.

Victory preferences
The table below lists opinion polling on the victory preferences for each party in the event of a general election taking place.

Victory likelihood
The table below lists opinion polling on the perceived likelihood of victory for each party in the event of a regional election taking place.

Preferred President
The table below lists opinion polling on leader preferences to become president of the Valencian Government.

Results

Overall

Distribution by constituency

Aftermath

Notes

References
Opinion poll sources

Other

2019 in the Valencian Community
Regional elections in the Valencian Community
Valencian Community
April 2019 events in Spain